Curetis tagalica, the Southern Sunbeam, is a species of butterfly belonging to the lycaenid family. It is found in  Southeast Asia (Philippines, Celebes, Palawan, Balabac, Borneo, Sumatra, Javan, Peninsular Malaya and Thailand).

Subspecies
Curetis tagalica tagalica (Philippines)
Curetis tagalica celebensis (C. & R. Felder, [1865]) (Sulawesi)
Curetis tagalica palawanica Staudinger, 1889 (Palawan, Balabac)
Curetis tagalica hera Fruhstorfer, 1900 (Nias)
Curetis tagalica jopa Fruhstorfer, 1908 (Borneo, Sumatra, Javan, Peninsular Malaysia, Thailand)
Curetis tagalica talautensis Chapman, 1915 (Talaud)
Curetis tagalica brunnescens Ribbe, 1926 (Sula, Bangka)
Curetis tagalica labuana Evans, 1954 (Labuan, Pulau Tioman, Natuna)
Curetis tagalica takanamii Schröder & Treadaway, 1989 (Sibutu)

References

External links
"Curetis Hübner, [1819]" at Markku Savela's Lepidoptera and Some Other Life Forms. Retrieved June 6, 2017.

tagalica
Butterflies described in 1862